Sonnenfeldt is a surname of:
 
 Richard Sonnenfeldt (1923-2009), American engineer and corporate executive
 Helmut Sonnenfeldt (1926–2012), known as Hal Sonnenfeldt, American foreign policy expert
 Michael W. Sonnenfeldt (born 1955), American entrepreneur

See also
 Sonnenfeld (disambiguation)